The Life Grenadier Regiment, designations I 4 and I 4/Fo 41, was a Swedish Army infantry regiment that traced its origins back to the 16th century. It was disbanded in 1997. The regiment's soldiers were originally recruited from the provinces of Östergötland, and it was later garrisoned there.

History 

The regiment has its origins in fänikor (companies) raised in the 16th century, these units formed Östergötland Infantry Regiment and Östergötland Cavalry Regiment which merged in 1791 and formed the Life Grenadier Regiment. It consisted of two semi-independent units, Livgrenadjärregementets rotehållsdivision and Livgrenadjärregementets rusthållsdivision originating from the two merged infantry and cavalry regiments.

The regiment was split in two in 1816, forming 1st Life Grenadier Regiment and 2nd Life Grenadier Regiment. These two units were later merged and reformed the Life Grenadier Regiment in 1928, and the regiment was given the designation I 4 (4th Infantry Regiment). In 1973, the regiment gained the new designation I 4/Fo 41 as a consequence of a merge with the local defence district Fo 41. The Life Grenadier Regiment was garrisoned in Linköping and was disbanded in 1997.

Campaigns

Organisation

Heraldry and traditions

Colours, standards and guidons
Its last colour was presented to the regiment in Linköping by His Majesty the King Gustaf VI Adolf on 25 September 1964. It was used as regimental colour by I 4/Fo 41 until 1 January 1998. The colour is drawn by Brita Grep and embroidered by hand in insertion technique by the company Libraria. Blazon: "On white cloth in the centre the Royal Swedish coat of arms as to the law without mantle. Below the cross of the Order of the Seraphim, an erect white sword. In each corner a blazing grenade - white in the first and fourth corner (a legacy from the former Royal First Life Grenadier Regiment, I 4) and red in the second and third corner (a legacy from the former Royal Second Life Grenadier Regiment, I 5). Battle honours (Varberg 1565, Breitenfeld 1631, Lützen 1632, Wittstock 1636, Leipzig 1642, Warszawa 1656, Fredriksodde 1657, Tåget över Bält 1658, Lund 1676, Rügen 1678, Kliszow 1702, Warszawa 1705, Holovczyn 1708, Malatitze 1708, Rajovka (1708, Helsingborg 1710, Gadebusch 1712, Valkeala 1790, Svensksund 1790) in yellow horizontally placed around the coat of arms."

Coat of arms
The coat of the arms of the Life Grenadier Regiment (I 4/Fo 41) 1977–1994, the Life Grenadier Brigade (Livgrenadjärbrigaden, IB 4) and the Life Grenadier Group (Livgrenadjärgruppen) since 1997. Blazon: "Azure, the lesser coat of arms of Sweden, three open crowns or placed two and one. The shield surmounted two muskets in saltire argent followed on both sides by blazing grenades, dexter argent and sinister gules". The coat of the arms of the Life Grenadier Regiment (I 4/Fo 41) 1994–1997. Blazon: "Azure, the lesser coat of arms of Sweden, three open crowns or placed two and one. The shield surmounted two muskets in saltire argent followed on both sides by blazing grenades, dexter
argent and sinister gules."

Medals
In 1996, the Livgrenadjärregementets (I 4) minnesmedalj ("Life Grenadier Regiment (I 4) Commemorative Medal") in silver (LivgregSMM) of the 8th size was established. The medal ribbon is divided in white and red moiré.

Heritage
Since 1 January 1998, the Life Grenadier Group (Livgrenadjärgruppen) has inherited the colours and traditions of the regiment. From 1 July 2013, the traditions of the regiment are continued by the 30th Life Grenadier Battalion and the 31st Life Grenadier Battalion, included in the Life Grenadier Group.

Commanding officers
Executive officers (Sekundchefer) and regimental commanders from 1792 to 1816 and 1928 to 1997. Sekundchef was a title used until 31 December 1974 in the regiments that were included in the King's Life and Household Troops (Kungl. Maj:ts Liv- och Hustrupper). From 1791 to 1809 the Crown Prince was regimental commander. From 1818 to 1974 His Majesty the King was regimental commander. From 1975 to 1997, the monarch was honorary commander of the regiment. From 1975 the regimental commander was also Defence District Commander, and held the rank of Senior Colonel.

Executive officers

1928–1933: Patrik Ludvig Teodor Falkman
1933–1937: Georg Alfred Edvard Ahlström
1937–1939: Carl Bennedich
1939–1943: Rutger R:son Gyllenram
1943–1952: Karl Einar Harald Appelbom
1951–1957: Per Axel Holger Stenholm
1957–1963: Pieter Fürst
1963–1971: Sven Widegren
1971–1974: Ingvar Selander
1974–1975: Lennart Tollerz

Regimental commanders

1928–1950: Gustaf V
1950–1973: Gustaf VI Adolf
1973–1974: Carl XVI Gustaf
1975–1979: Lennart Bredberg
1979–1982: Senior colonel Sven Torfgård
1982–1987: Per-Arne Ringh
1987–1991: Lars-Eric Widman
1991–1995: Torbjörn Tillman
1995–1997: Gunnar Ridderstad

Deputy regimental commanders
1978–1981: Colonel Holger Bjärnlid

Names, designations and locations

See also
List of Swedish infantry regiments

Footnotes

References

Notes

Print

Further reading

Grenadier regiments of Sweden
Military units and formations established in 1928
Military units and formations disestablished in 1997
Disbanded units and formations of Sweden
1928 establishments in Sweden
1997 disestablishments in Sweden
Linköping Garrison